Sweet, Soft N' Lazy - The Very Best Of is the first official best-of album by French-Belgian singer Viktor Lazlo.

This compilation album contained songs from her previous albums She (1985), Viktor Lazlo (1987), Hot & Soul (1989) and My Delicious Poisons (1991), as well her duet hit single Das erste Mal tat's noch weh with Stefan Waggershausen, which was a big hit in Germany, Austria and Switzerland.

The only new song on this album was The Dream Is In Our Hands, which was also released as a single.

Track listing

References

1993 albums
Viktor Lazlo albums